Coleophora autumnella is a moth of the family Coleophoridae that can be found in Czech Republic, Slovakia, Austria, Romania and Spain.

The larvae feed on Aster alpinus and Aster amellus. They create a tubular silken case, covered with grains of sand and detritus. Full-grown larvae can be found in May.

References

External links

autumnella
Moths of Europe
Moths described in 1843